Pogonota barbata is a species of fly belonging to the family Scathophagidae.

It is native to Europe and Northern America.

References

Scathophagidae